Witchell is a surname. Notable people with the surname include:

 Henry Witchell (1906–1965), English cricketer
 Jonathan Witchell (1974–2007), British journalist 
 Nicholas Witchell (born 1953), English journalist and news presenter

See also
 Mitchell (surname)